Reginald Edgar Walker (16 March 1889 in Durban – 5 November 1951) was a South African athlete and the 1908 Olympic champion in the 100 metres.

Born in the Colony of Natal, Walker, the 1907 South African Champion, was not among the big favourites for the 100 metres at the 1908 Summer Olympics. He even had trouble getting to London, as he lacked the necessary finances until a Natal sportswriter collected funds to support Walker's travel. In England, he was coached by Sam Mussabini, later also the coach of Harold Abrahams.

Several of the big names did not qualify for the final, but Walker did. His first round was a relatively easy victory run in 11.0 seconds. In the second round, Walker edged out William W. May of the United States while tying the Olympic record of 10.8 seconds. This qualified him for the final. There he competed against three North Americans, including James Rector of the United States, who had equalled the Olympic Record in both of the qualifier rounds. Walker beat Rector in the final by about a foot and half, again equaling the Olympic record in 10.8 seconds.

Walker is still the youngest winner of the Olympic 100 metres  (at 19 years and 128 days).

During World War I, Walker served with the 7th Infantry in German South West Africa, before joining the South African Overseas Expeditionary Force in 1917, serving in France, during which time he received a gunshot wound to the head. Walker was discharged from the Army in 1919 and later worked as a clerk with Ropes & Mattings in Nairobi, Kenya Colony, before returning to South Africa.

References

Sources

External links
 Reggie Walker on databaseOlympics.com

1889 births
1951 deaths
Sportspeople from Durban
South African male sprinters
Athletes (track and field) at the 1908 Summer Olympics
Olympic athletes of South Africa
Olympic gold medalists for South Africa
Colony of Natal people
Medalists at the 1908 Summer Olympics
Olympic gold medalists in athletics (track and field)
South African military personnel of World War I
19th-century South African people
20th-century South African people